Drive: Glay Complete Best (typeset as DRIVE ~GLAY complete BEST~) is the second "greatest hits" album by Japanese pop/rock band Glay. It is composed by some of Glay's most popular singles and album tracks from their debut in 1994 to 2000. The two discs each contain hits from albums Speed Pop to Heavy Gauge as well as various singles. The album peaked at #1 at Oricon charts and sold 2,637,420 according to the charts. The album was certified "Double Million" by the Recording Industry Association of Japan (RIAJ).

Track listing

Disc 1 

"Shutter Speeds no tēma" (The theme song of Shutter Speeds)

"Happy Swing"

"Soul Love"
"However"
"I'm in Love"

Disc 2 

"Beloved"
"Happiness"
"Survival"
"Pure Soul"
"Be with You"
"Winter, Again"

"Special Thanks"
"Missing You"

References
 Glay
 Oricon - Glay's profile on the Oricon

Glay albums
2000 compilation albums
Pony Canyon compilation albums